Fukushima held a gubernatorial election on November 12, 2006. Yuhei Sato, supported by the DPJ and SDP was re-elected.

Sources 
 Official results
 ザ･選挙　-選挙情報-

2006 elections in Japan
Gubernatorial elections in Japan
November 2006 events in Japan
Politics of Fukushima Prefecture